The science of webometrics (also cybermetrics) tries to measure the World Wide Web to get knowledge about the number and types of hyperlinks, structure of the World Wide Web and using patterns. According to Björneborn and Ingwersen, the definition of webometrics is "the study of the quantitative aspects of the construction and use of information resources, structures and technologies on the Web drawing on bibliometric and informetric approaches." The term webometrics was first coined by Almind and Ingwersen (1997). A second definition of webometrics has also been introduced, "the study of web-based content with primarily quantitative methods for social science research goals using techniques that are not specific to one field of study", which emphasizes the development of applied methods for use in the wider social sciences. The purpose of this alternative definition was to help publicize appropriate methods outside of the information science discipline rather than to replace the original definition within information science.

Similar scientific fields are: bibliometrics, informetrics, scientometrics, virtual ethnography, and web mining.

One relatively straightforward measure is the "Web Impact Factor" (WIF) introduced by Ingwersen (1998). The WIF measure may be defined as the number of web pages in a web site receiving links from other web sites, divided by the number of web pages published in the site that are accessible to the crawler. However the use of WIF has been disregarded due to the mathematical artifacts derived from power law distributions of these variables. Other similar indicators using size of the institution instead of number of webpages have been proved more useful.

See also 
 Altmetrics
 Impact factor
 PageRank
 Network mapping
 Search engine
 Webometrics Ranking of World Universities

References

Bibliography 
 
 

 
 

 

Web analytics
Information science
Information retrieval techniques